This article lists awards won at the New Zealand film festival formerly known as the DOCNZ Film Festival, then Documentary Edge Festival and now branded Doc Edge, since its inaugural edition in 2005 until 2012.

Awards 2012

International Selection

New Zealand Selection

Awards 2011

International Selection

New Zealand Selection

Awards 2010

International Selection

New Zealand Selection

Awards 2009

International Selection

New Zealand Selection

Awards 2008 
No Festival this year.

Awards 2007

International Selection

New Zealand Selection

Awards 2006

International Selection

New Zealand Selection

Awards 2005

See also
 List of television awards

References

Sources
2005–2011: 
2005–2012:

External links 

New Zealand television awards